Huanhepterus  is an extinct genus of ctenochasmatid pterodactyloid pterosaur from the Early Cretaceous period of what is now Qingyang, Gansu, China.

History
The genus was named by Dong Zhiming in 1982. The type species is Huanhepterus quingyangensis. The genus name refers to the Huang Jian (not the Yellow River or "Huang He", but a smaller tributary of the Jinghe River in Gansu), and combines it with a Latinized Greek pteron, "wing". The specific name refers to Qinyang County.

Huanhepterus is based on the holotype specimen, IVPP V9070, a partial articulated skeleton consisting mostly of impressions of the left half of the body and the beak-end of the skull. The fossil was in May 1978 found in a quarry operated by the Sanshilipu-commune, when an explosion exposed a vertebra. Its force obliterated the right half of the specimen. IVPP V9070 hails from the Early Cretaceous-age Huachihuanhe Formation of the Zhidan Group.

Description
Huanhepterus had a long, low skull, with a low crest running along the midline that was higher toward the tip of the snout and became smaller toward the eyes. The teeth, about 26 pairs in the upper and 25 in the lower jaws, were slender and numerous, and became shorter farther from the 11th pair, both to the front as to the back, where they become absent completely in posterior part of the snout. The cervical vertebrae were long, as were the toes, and there was no fused complex of the front dorsal vertebrae (notarium), as seen in other pterosaurs. The wingspan of the type individual was estimated at 2.5 m (8.2 ft). This genus was described as most like Gnathosaurus. David Unwin later referred it the Gnathosaurinae, a subgroup of the Ctenochasmatidae.

Classification
Below is cladogram following a topology by Andres, Clark and Xu (2014). In the analysis, they recovered Huanhepterus within the family Ctenochasmatidae, more precisely within the subfamily Gnathosaurinae, though placed in the basalmost position.

Biology
Like Gnathosaurus, it may have used its tightly-packed, slender teeth to filter food from water.

See also
 List of pterosaur genera
 Timeline of pterosaur research

References

External links
Huanhepterus in The Pterosauria

Ctenochasmatoids
Early Cretaceous pterosaurs of Asia
Taxa named by Dong Zhiming
Fossil taxa described in 1982